Yonatan "Jonny" Hardy (June 2, 1934 - November 6, 2017) was a former Israeli footballer. He is best known for his years at Maccabi Haifa where he started his football career as well as his managerial career.

Childhood
Though born in Haifa, Hardy grew up in Egypt since his father worked for the rail company, then under British control.

References

External links
Jonny Hardy Maccabi Haifa 

1934 births
2017 deaths
Israeli footballers
Maccabi Haifa F.C. players
Beitar Haifa F.C. players
Maccabi Haifa F.C. managers
Footballers from Haifa
Association football forwards
Israeli football managers